The Embraer E-Jet E2 family are medium-range jet airliners developed by Embraer, succeeding the original E-Jet. The program was launched at the Paris Air Show in 2013. The first variant, the E190-E2, took its first flight on 23 May 2016 and was certified on 28 February 2018 before entering service with Widerøe on 24 April.

The three twinjet variants share the same four-abreast narrow-body fuselage with different lengths and three different new wings, Pratt & Whitney PW1000G turbofans in two sizes, fly-by-wire controls with new avionics, and an updated cabin.

Development

Background
In 2010, it appeared possible Embraer could directly challenge the Bombardier CSeries (now A220) with a clean-sheet five-abreast design for 100 to 150 passengers. When that market segment grew more competitive with the announcement of the Airbus A320neo and the Boeing 737 MAX, Embraer had instead committed to producing new variants of its E-Jet family of regional jets by the time of the November 2011 Dubai Air Show.

These new variants would be better positioned to compete with the CSeries and would be powered by new engines with larger diameter fans that would offer improvements in specific fuel consumption, as well as slightly taller landing gear and possibly a new aluminum or carbon fiber-based wing. Embraer named this new development "the E-jets second generation". The $1.7 billion program was launched at the Paris Air Show in 2013.

Flight testing

The first E-Jet E2, an E190-E2, was rolled out on 25 February 2016 and made its maiden flight on 23 May in São José dos Campos. It flew earlier than the previously anticipated second half of 2016. The program had fewer challenges than expected and introduction was then planned in the first quarter of 2018. The airplane was slightly below expected weight and the other two E190-E2 prototypes should fly within a year.

The second prototype made its maiden flight on 8 July 2016. The flight lasted 2 hours and 55 minutes without any incidents. The first E-Jet E2 flew from Brazil to Farnborough Airshow just 45 days after its maiden flight, demonstrating maturity and confidence in the design. In April 2017, as 650 hours of flight tests had been completed and the program was on schedule. Embraer wants to guarantee a 99% schedule reliability in the first year of service.

Half of the flight testing was done by June 2017; the aerodynamics were better than predicted and the E190-E2 hot and high performance was better than expected. In June 2017, the four E190-E2s and the single E195-E2 - which was presented at the 2017 Paris Air Show - had made more than 900 flight-test hours, mostly by the E190-E2s. In July 2017, the five aircraft had flown 1,000 flight-test hours while the E190-E2 had accomplished 55% of its test campaign.

In January 2018, 98% of the test campaign was done with 2,000 flight hours. Fuel burn was 17.3% lower than for the E190 up from 16% predicted.

The E190-E2 received its type certificate from the ANAC, FAA and EASA on 28 February 2018. The first production engines for the larger variant were delivered in February 2019 and should deliver a 24% reduction in per-seat fuel burn compared with the E195. The E195-E2 obtained its type certification in April 2019.

Production

Inspired by the automotive industry's production of multiple models on the same line, Embraer proposed building the E190/195-E2 alongside the original E175/190/195 at a steady rate of eight aircraft per month by the end of 2018. Production of the original E-Jet family was projected to slow if assembly of the E175-E2 had started in 2021.

As Embraer transitioned from its previous E-jets to the upgraded E2, it was expecting to deliver 85-95 airliners in 2018 with a negative $150 million free cash flow, less than in 2017 with 78 deliveries in the first nine months with a cash outflow of $700 million: return to profitability will take at least three years once the program investment is reduced and the production ramp up is complete.

E2s was to account for 10% of Embraer airliner deliveries in 2018 before a planned rise in 2019. Embraer thought Airbus would not be able to lower the A220 supply chain costs enough to make it profitable and viewed the A220 as a heavy, expensive and long-range aircraft. Embraer hoped the E2's operational capabilities would win a majority of the market share as commitments were hoped to follow certification and entry into service. Embraer delivered 101 airliners in 2017, down from 162 in 2008, but targeted delivering 14 E2 monthly or even 16 or 18. Hybrid stations capable of work on either the E1 or E2 were more automated, moving to 90% automated drilling and riveting for the E2 wing.

Introduction

After type certification, the first E190-E2 was delivered to launch operator Widerøe in April 2018, configured with 114-seat in single-class, followed by deliveries for Air Astana and Chinese GX Airlines. Before the aircraft were delivered, Embraer announced that some of the initial E-Jet E2s will need to be retrofitted due to the shorter life of the combustor in their Pratt & Whitney PW1900G engines.

Embraer targets a 99% dispatch reliability after 12 months and 99.5% after four years while the E1 took 10 years to achieve its targeted reliability. On 4 April 2018, Widerøe took delivery of its first E190-E2 in Sao Jose dos Campos. It was introduced between Bergen and Tromsø, Norway on 24 April 2018. By June 2018, the first three E190-E2s delivered to Wideroe accumulated 413 flight hours and 332 cycles, an average of 6.57 cycles per day and an average stage length of 1.28 hours, with a 99.35% dispatch reliability and a 97.74% schedule reliability. Widerøe had a dispatch reliability of 98.5% after its first year of operation.

Boeing–Embraer joint venture

In December 2017, Boeing and Embraer were discussing a potential combination.
On July 5, 2018, Boeing and Embraer announced a Memorandum of Understanding to establish a joint venture, in which Boeing would hold an 80% stake, to produce and service Embraer's commercial airliners, including the E-Jet E2. Aviation industry analysts noted that the deal would be good for both companies, as Boeing needed smaller aircraft, like the E-Jet and E-Jet E2 families, and Embraer needed the marketing power of a larger company as the E-Jet E2 family was selling slowly.

On February 26, 2019, the partnership was approved by Embraer's shareholders, and the new joint venture was waiting for regulatory approval. On April 24, 2020, Boeing terminated the deal, stating that Embraer did not satisfy the conditions of the agreement. Embraer rejected Boeing's reasons, saying the company sought to avoid its commitments and said it would pursue "all remedies against Boeing for the damages incurred," which industry analysts believe may include damages for orders that were lost while customers were waiting for the deal to close.

Design

Embraer targets 16 to 24% lower fuel burn and 15–25% lower maintenance cost per seat. In the E190-E2, of the 17.3% better fuel burn, 11% comes from the geared turbofan, 4.8% from the improved aerodynamics of the new high aspect ratio wing and 1.5% from the fly-by-wire's 15% smaller tail surfaces.

Over a  trip and with a US$72 fuel barrel, Embraer estimates a 97-seat E190-E2 trip cost is 7% lower for a 1% higher seat cost than a 106-seat A220-100, a 120-seat E195-E2 has a 2% higher trip cost but a 10% lower seat cost and 10% lower trip cost and 3% lower seat cost than a 129-seat A220-300; and while a 97-seat E190 had an 18% higher seat cost than a 150-seat A320 and a 23% lower trip cost, an E190-E2 has a 30% lower trip cost for an 8% higher seat cost than a 150-seat A320neo, while an E195-E2 has the same seat cost but 20% lower trip cost. By October, Embraer raised its E190/E195-E2 seat or trip costs claim to roughly 10% better than the A220.

Built on the first generation E-Jet, its wing is redesigned, and it introduces new pylons, landing gear, horizontal stabilizers, cabin, cabin air system, air cycle machine, bleed air system, and a new fly-by-wire system. The switch to a composite wing was not yet justified economically for a similar shape, the less draggy flaps are single-slotted instead of the more complex double-slotted on the E1, and the engine pylon is shorter. The raised, 11:1 aspect ratio gull-wing partially accommodate the  diameter geared turbofan engine, larger than the CF34 engine by  while the trailing arm landing gear is taller for  higher door sills, giving a  lower nacelles than the E1.

GE Aviation, Pratt & Whitney, and Rolls-Royce were all possible engine suppliers. In January 2013, Embraer selected the Pratt & Whitney PW1000G Geared Turbofan engine as the exclusive powerplant. Honeywell Primus Epic 2 was selected as the avionics package. In 2014, Alta Precision was selected to produce main landing gear components for the E190/E195 E2.

Moog Inc was selected to supply the Primary Flight Control System. The E2 features a closed loop fly-by-wire control which reduces weight, increases fuel efficiency, enhances control and increases safety by full envelope protection in all flight phases compared to the first E-Jet. The fuel savings of the now closed loop fly-by-wire control come from the enhanced flight stability and the resulting increased lift (lower tail downward force) and weight savings and drag reductions related to the 26% reduction in the horizontal tail (tailplane) size. The wing structure was lightened by  due to the fly-by-wire ailerons, also used when braking, avoiding larger wheels and brakes.

The cabin side walls were replaced to gain  on each side and new overhead bins are  deeper. Baggage bins are enlarged by 40%.

Basic maintenance inspections will happen every 1,000 flight hours instead of 850 and the intermediate check interval grew to 10,000 flight hours from 8,500. The heavy-check downtime was reduced by 15% from the E1, no out-of-phase tasks are required, and control and corrosion prevention is required every eight years with 82 tasks down from 240.

Operational history 

On 3 December 2018, Air Astana received its first E190-E2 of an order of five, to replace nine E190LR used on domestic and regional routes since 2011.

On 31 October 2019, Helvetic Airways became the fourth airline to take delivery of an E2 aircraft and the third (after Widerøe and Air Astana) to receive an E190-E2 aircraft, configured in a single-class layout with 110 seats. On 1 November 2019, Helvetic Airways made their first revenue flight with the E190-E2.

On 21 November 2019, Binter Canarias became the fifth airline to take delivery of an E2 aircraft and the second (after Azul Brazilian Airlines) to receive an E195-E2 aircraft, configured in a single-class layout with 132 seats. On 13 December 2019, Binter Canarias made their first revenue flight with the E195-E2, which was to depart from Gran Canaria at 11:35 and to arrive at Sal at 14:00.

On 30 December 2019, Air Kiribati received its first E190-E2 of an order of two, becoming the fourth airline to take delivery of an E190-E2 aircraft. The airliner, configured in a two-class layout with 92 seats (12 business and 80 economy class), is to serve destinations throughout the vast expanse of Kiribati, including nonstop from Tarawa to Kiritimati (Christmas) Island (the current domestic flight from Tarawa to Kiritimati requires an international stopover in Fiji).

Variants

E175-E2
The E175-E2 (EMB 190-500) model is the smallest in the E-Jet Second Generation family. In 2013, the aircraft was expected to cost US$46.8 million. 

While the first-generation E175 proved popular with regional airlines in the United States, the weight of the E175-E2 has prevented sales to these customers. Scope clause agreements between mainline carriers and their pilots unions prevent these airlines from contracting with regional airlines to operate aircraft with maximum takeoff weight exceeding .

The first E175-E2 prototype made its first takeoff on 12 December 2019 from São José dos Campos and flew for 2 hours and 18 minutes, starting a test and certification campaign that was expected to take 24 months and involve two additional aircraft. At that time, Embraer said it believed there would be for strong demand for the jet from outside North America, but  the company has received no orders for the variant.

First delivery was initially scheduled for 2021. It has been repeatedly delayed and in February 2022, Embraer announced that it will be halting development of the E175-E2 for three years, with deliveries expected to begin between 2027 and 2028.

E190-E2

The  PW1900G has a  fan for a 12:1 bypass ratio. It was moved forward to shift the center of gravity envelope aft to reduce the horizontal stabilizer downforce, lowering fuel burn by 1.5%. The trailing link main landing gear has wheel doors to reduce fuel consumption by 1% and is  taller to provide enough engine ground clearance. The E2 have 75% new parts, closed-loop controls fly-by-wire instead of the open-loop type in the E1 gaining improved maintenance intervals. For E1-rated pilots, the transition to the new type need 2.5 days with no full flight simulator, having similar Honeywell Primus Epic 2 avionics. The E190-E2 (EMB 190-300) has a  wider wingspan but otherwise is close in size to the E190, with up to 114 seats in a single class configuration.

The E190-E2 unit cost was US$53.6 million in 2013. Embraer had it certified on 28 February 2018. Certification needed 46,000 test hours on ground and 2,200 in flight. It entered service with Widerøe on 24 April 2018. In 2018, a newly delivered E190-E2 is worth $34 million, $3 million more than the E190, falling to $20 million in seven years, a 40% decline to be compared with 30% projected for an A320neo over the same timeframe.

E195-E2

The E195-E2 unit cost was US$60.4 million in 2013.

The variant rolled out on 7 March 2017 and Azul was confirmed as its launch operator. It first flew on 29 March 2017, ahead of the previously scheduled second half of the year. Embraer showcased the prototype at the Paris Air Show in June 2017 and plan to enter service in the first half of 2019.

By January 2019, the flight-test program preliminary results shows the E195-E2 could end up being a little above specifications at introduction. It was certified on 15 April 2019, with a fuel burn 1.4% less than originally specified for 25.4% less per seat than the E195. Binter Canarias should be its European launch customer, to enter service in late 2019.

On 12 September 2019, Embraer delivered its first E195-E2 to Azul through lessor AerCap, configured with 136 seats in a single class.

It competes with the Airbus A220-300, at a lower unit cost.  As well, Embraer claims E195 trip costs are 22% lower than a 154-seat A320neo and 24% below a 160-seat 737-8 - but airlines install more seats, widening seat costs further apart than the 6% and 8% quoted by Embraer.

On 22 July 2022, an E195-E2 landed at London City Airport (LCY) for the first time, making it the largest aircraft cleared to operate from the small airport.

Operators 
, there were 56 E2-Jet aircraft in commercial service with nine operators; the five largest operators are Azul Brazilian Airlines (15), KLM Cityhopper (15), Helvetic Airways (12), Porter Airlines (8) and Air Astana (5).

Model summary

Source: Embraer's order book as of 31 December 2022.

Deliveries by year

Orders and deliveries
The Embraer E-Jet E2 program was officially launched during the 50th International Paris Air Show held in June 2013, with SkyWest Airlines, a North American regional airline, and ILFC, a leasing company placing the first firm orders for the aircraft.

SkyWest was intended as the launch customer of the Embraer E175-E2, with the airline placing a firm order for 100 aircraft, with purchase rights for another 100, an order valued at US$9.36 billion at list price, although airlines routinely receive deep discounts from the list price of planes. The order was canceled in Q3 of 2018.

ILFC is the launch customer for the Embraer E190-E2 and E195-E2, with the leasing company placing a firm order for 25 E190-E2 aircraft and 25 E195-E2 aircraft, with purchase rights for another 25 of each type. ILFC was purchased by AerCap in May 2014.

Binter Canarias has converted two options for Embraer E195-E2 aircraft to firm orders. Their first new Embraer aircraft is expected to be delivered in the second half of 2019 with Binter Canarias being the European launch customer. KLM is to lease 25 E195-E2s from Aircastle (15) and ICBC (10) instead of buying from Embraer.

Specifications

See also

References

External links

 
 
 
 

2010s Brazilian airliners
Embraer aircraft
Twinjets
Aircraft first flown in 2016